Luis Alfonso Tipán (born February 8, 1954) is a retired male athlete from Ecuador, who competed in the long-distance running events during his career.

He represented his native South American country at the 1984 Summer Olympics in Los Angeles, California. Tipán set his personal best (2:28:30) in the men's marathon on August 14, 1983 in Helsinki, Finland.

International competitions

References

sports-reference

1954 births
Living people
Ecuadorian male marathon runners
Ecuadorian male long-distance runners
Ecuadorian male steeplechase runners
Olympic athletes of Ecuador
Athletes (track and field) at the 1984 Summer Olympics
World Athletics Championships athletes for Ecuador
South American Games gold medalists for Ecuador
South American Games silver medalists for Ecuador
South American Games medalists in athletics
Athletes (track and field) at the 1979 Pan American Games
Competitors at the 1978 Southern Cross Games
Competitors at the 1982 Southern Cross Games
Pan American Games competitors for Ecuador